Bill Cartwright (born 1957) is an American basketball player and coach.

Bill Cartwright may also refer to:

Bill Cartwright (footballer, born 1884) (1884–?), English footballer who played for Gainsborough, Chelsea and Tottenham from 1908 to 1913
Bill Cartwright (footballer, born 1922) (1922–1992), English footballer who played for Tranmere Rovers from 1946 to 1948

See also
William Cartwright (disambiguation)
Cartwright (surname)